Strange Bargain is a 1949 American crime film noir directed by Will Price and starring Martha Scott, Jeffrey Lynn and Harry Morgan.

It is the story of a bookkeeper in need of money who agrees against his own better judgment to help a wealthy man carry out an elaborate suicide plan.

Plot
Bookkeeper Sam Wilson goes to his boss, Malcolm Jarvis, to ask for a raise, but learns he is about to lose his job because the firm is bankrupt. Jarvis then makes a strange proposition, saying he intends to commit suicide in order for his wife Edna and son Sydney to inherit his life insurance. Jarvis wants Sam to  dispose of the evidence of the suicide and make it look like murder, and will pay him $10,000 to do it.

Sam declines, but when he goes to see Jarvis and finds his dead body, he reluctantly goes along with the scheme. He finds an envelope with $10,000 that Jarvis has left behind for him, which he hides from Georgia, his wife. He disposes of the weapon as well, so Jarvis's fingerprints from the suicide won't be found.

Lt. Webb of the police is suspicious of Jarvis's business partner, Timothy Hearne. In the meantime, Sam's conscience gets the better of him. When he goes to see Edna Jarvis to confess his role in her husband's death, Edna reveals she's the one who committed the murder, Jarvis having changed his mind about the fake suicide. Edna is about to kill Sam as well when Webb shows up in the nick of time.

Cast
 Martha Scott as Georgia Wilson
 Jeffrey Lynn as Sam Wilson
 Harry Morgan as Lt. Richard Webb
 Katherine Emery as Edna Jarvis
 Richard Gaines as Malcolm Jarvis
 Henry O'Neill as Timothy Hearne
 Walter Sande as Sgt. Cord
 Michael Chapin as Roddy Wilson
 Arlene Gray as Hilda Wilson
 Raymond Roe as Sydney Jarvis
 Robert Bray as Det. McTay

Reception

Critical response
A.H. Weiler, the film critic for the New York Times penned a fairly positive review. He wrote, "As a modest entry from Hollywood, Strange Bargain, which began a stand yesterday as the associate attraction to the Palace's vaudeville bill, is surprisingly diverting fare. Obviously not intended to set a cinematic landmark, it is, nevertheless, a melodrama that presents an extraordinary situation fairly suspensefully and, for the most part, through intelligent dialogue and direction. And, while it follows a familiar outline as a crime and punishment adventure, it does so neatly and with competent characterizations."

Film critic Dennis Schwartz called the film "[a] well-conceived mystery B-film, but strictly second feature material."  He also noted in his review that "Strange Bargain showed up in a 1987 episode of TV's Murder, She Wrote. By removing the original happy ending, the TV installment allowed Angela Lansbury to solve the mystery of the boss' murder--and to exonerate the long-imprisoned bookkeeper, played again by Jeffrey Lynn. Also appearing on this Murder She Wrote were Lynn's Strange Bargain costars Martha Scott and Harry Morgan."

Murder, She Wrote
In 1987, the television series Murder, She Wrote broadcast an episode that served as a sequel to Strange Bargain. This discounted the original ending of the film, instead seeing Jessica Fletcher being recruited to attempt to prove Sam Wilson's innocence following his 30-year prison sentence. The episode, “The Days Dwindle Down”, saw the stars of the film, Martha Scott, Jeffrey Lynn and Harry Morgan, reprising their original roles.

References

External links
 
 
 
 
 

1952 films
1950s crime drama films
American crime drama films
American black-and-white films
American detective films
Film noir
Films scored by Friedrich Hollaender
RKO Pictures films
1952 drama films
Films directed by Will Price
1950s English-language films
1940s English-language films
1940s American films
1950s American films